Convalmore distillery was a whisky distillery in Dufftown, Moray, Scotland. The distillery was established in 1893/1894 and closed in 1985.

The distillery was founded by Convalmore-Glenlivet Distillers Co. Ltd and in 1904 was sold to W&P Lowrie & Co. Ltd. In 1925, the distillery passed to Scottish Malt Distillers and The Distillers Company Ltd.

The site of the distillery is now owned by William Grant & Sons and is part of the greater Glenfiddich distillery and Balvenie distillery site. It was acquired by WG & Sons in 1992 to augment their warehouse capacity. The market rights to the name and bottling remain with Diageo.

The name of the distillery derives from the nearby Conval hills which are located just north of Dufftown.

References 

1894 establishments in Scotland
1985 disestablishments in Scotland
Scottish malt whisky
Distilleries in Scotland
British companies established in 1894
British companies disestablished in 1985